The FC-PH standard defines three time-out values used for error detection and recovery in Fibre Channel protocol.

E_D_TOV stands for Error Detect TimeOut Value.  This is the basic error timeout used for all Fibre Channel error detection.  Its default value is 2 seconds.

R_A_TOV stands for Resource Allocation TimeOut Value.  This is the amount of time given to devices to allocate the resources needed to process received frames. In practice this may be the time for re-calculation of routing tables in network devices. Its default value is 10 seconds.

R_T_TOV stands for Receiver-Transmitter TimeOut Value.  This is the amount of time that the receiver logic uses to determine loss of sync on the wire.  Its default value is 100 milliseconds, but can be changed to 100 microseconds.

All devices must use the default values until they have established different values (if they desire) with other devices, usually specified during the login procedure.

Fibre Channel